Harry Kay Hedge, Jr. (April 2, 1928 – October 28, 2016) was an American politician in the state of Iowa.

Hedge was born in Rose Hill, Iowa. He attended University of Iowa and was a farmer. He served in the Iowa State Senate from 1989 to 2001, as a Republican. He served in the United States Army during the Korean War. Hedge served on the Fremont School Board and the Mahaska County School Board.  Hedge died on October 28, 2016, in Ottumwa, Iowa.

References

1928 births
2016 deaths
People from Mahaska County, Iowa
University of Iowa alumni
Farmers from Iowa
School board members in Iowa
Republican Party Iowa state senators